F/A-XX is a development and acquisition program for a future sixth-generation air superiority fighter to replace the United States Navy's F/A-18E/F Super Hornet and complement the F-35C beginning in the 2030s. A requirement was first identified in June 2008.

The F/A-XX is expected to be the manned fighter component and centerpiece of the Navy's Next Generation Air Dominance (NGAD) family of systems. Although identically named and sharing some technology developments, this program is distinct from the U.S. Air Force's NGAD sixth-generation fighter program.

Requirements

Air superiority fighter with multi-role capabilities 

In April 2012, the Navy issued a formal request for information for the F/A-XX. It calls for an air superiority fighter with multi-role capabilities to initially complement and eventually supersede the F/A-18E/F Super Hornet and EA-18G Growler aircraft in the 2030s, while complementing the F-35C Lightning II and UCLASS unmanned aircraft, that can operate in anti-access/area denial environments. Primary missions include air combat, air to air, ground attack, surface warfare, and close air support. Platform requirements include supercruise capabilities as well as advanced next-generation stealth features, sensors and radars with networking adaptability.  Additional missions and capabilities include air-to-air refueling, reconnaissance, surveillance, and target acquisition (RSTA), and electronic warfare and countermeasures thereof.  Manned, unmanned, and optionally-manned operations for a highly adaptive platform will be part of the new system.  The F/A-XX is being pursued as F/A-18 Super Hornets will reach the end of their 9,000 hours of service life by the early 2030s. Aside from the option of buying more F-35Cs, the F/A-XX is seeking to create a new aircraft to replace the Super Hornet's capability and mission set. Just as the F-35C replaced aging F/A-18 Hornets and complement Super Hornets, the F/A-XX will replace aging Super Hornets in the 2030s and complement the F-35C.

Maximum connectivity and sensors 
Although the F/A-XX platform will be a sixth-generation fighter aircraft, the Navy is reluctant to talk about a new aircraft because the project is still in the very early stages of development.  A range of next-generation technologies may be explored including maximum sensor connectivity, and electronically configured "smart skins".  Maximum connectivity refers to massively increased communications and sensor technology, such as having the ability to connect with satellites, other aircraft, and anything providing real-time battlefield information. Smart skins would have sensors and electronics integrated into the fuselage of the aircraft itself to increase sensor performance while reducing drag and increasing speed and maneuverability.

Open architecture 
An open architecture design is desired, so different sensors, payloads, and weapons can be plugged in for a specific mission, and be able to be moved around for multiple different missions on different days or different sorties. The resulting open architecture design is likely to take shape depending on which style of new propulsion system is presented by the aircraft industry.

Propulsion 
The Navy is working with the U.S. Air Force on a next-generation tactical fighter with super cruise ability, and there is significant disagreement over the Air Force's claims that adaptive-cycle jet engine technology, where the ratios of bypass and compression airflow can be made variable to improve efficiency, can be scaled to benefit a carrier-based fighter.

New spectrum of weapons 
Chief of Naval Operations Jonathan Greenert speculated in February 2015 that the F/A-XX would not rely primarily on speed or stealth as much as previous-generation jet fighters due to better signature detection and proliferating high-speed anti-aircraft weapons. Instead, in addition to its protective features provided by its stealth features, technologies, maneuverability and speed, the fighter is to carry a wide array of new spectrum of advanced weaponry to overwhelm or suppress enemy air defenses and ensure survivability and superiority. One approach could create a minimum cost F/A-XX that uses high-cost, high-performance weapons to defeat threats; according to the Navy's Naval Integrated Fire Control-Counter Air (NIFC-CA) battle network concept, an individual platform would not need to have a full suite of sensors and rely on off-board data-linked information from other platforms to provide targeting information and guide weapons launched from the platform. The F/A-XX platforms will be made to carry missiles, have power and cooling systems for directed-energy weapons, and have sensors that can target small radar cross-section targets; cyber warfare platforms at a tactical level as part of a family of systems are being explored.

Increased payload 
The total payload capacity, range and variety of weaponry and equipment of the F/A-XX will at least match or likely exceed the current platform i.e. Super Hornet's payload capacity and capabilities.

Unmanned 
In May 2015, Secretary of the Navy Ray Mabus stated that the F/A-XX should be a platform with the capability of optional unmanned autonomous operation. The effort may produce a family of systems to replace the capabilities of the F/A-18E/F and EA-18G rather than a single airframe, and the Navy is now conducting an analysis of alternatives for their next-generation aircraft in partnership with the Air Force. Greenert favors an optionally manned aircraft for a modular section that can either hold a pilot or more sensors.

Aircraft carrier compatible 
The aircraft must be capable of operating from Navy Nimitz-class and Gerald R. Ford-class aircraft carriers.

Entries

In July 2009, Boeing first publicly unveiled a sixth-generation fighter concept for the F/A-XX program requirement officially revealing its project development. Its renderings and concepts showed a stealth two-seat, twin-engined tailless jet with a blended wing fuselage. Featuring a tandem cockpit, Boeing disclosed that it is intended to be manned or unmanned depending on the mission. The fighter concept is in the  weight class. The Northrop Grumman X-47B that was chosen for the UCAS-D program has also been proposed for the F/A-XX effort.

Boeing unveiled an updated F/A-XX sixth-generation fighter concept in April 2013. The concept is a tailless twin-engine stealth fighter available in manned and unmanned configurations. It has canards, which usually compromises the frontal radar cross-section, but the lack of a tail shows an emphasis on all-aspect stealth. It also has diverterless supersonic inlets similar to the F-35. The manned version seems to have restricted rearward visibility without the aid of a sensor.

Program timeline 
In 2011, the Department of Defense (DOD) planned to replace older F/A-18C/D Hornets with 220 F-35s. In March of that year, a Navy analysis of alternatives showed that it might buy more F-35C aircraft, develop a new platform, or do both for its NGAD fighter program. In a May 2011 report to Congress, DOD revealed that it was considering buying more F-35C fighters to replace 556 Super Hornets.

On 9 September 2014, the Navy announced that an Analysis of Alternatives (AOA) for the F/A-XX aircraft would begin in 2015. Meetings with industry would be held focusing on building new aircraft to meet the requirement, developing a "family of systems" approach, and discussing mission systems, avionics, and new next-generation weapons systems.

On 4 April 2019, RADM Scott D. Conn, director of Air Warfare in the Office of the Chief of Naval Operations, stated that the Analysis of Alternatives (AoA) for the F/A-XX was to be completed in the spring of 2019, with a final report due in the summer of 2019.  After the F/A-XX AoA was completed in June 2019, the Navy began the concept development phase of the development process.  However, concerns were raised about funding, with Bryan Clark of the Hudson Institute predicting that the program would evolve into a modification of the F-35 or F/A-18 Super Hornet.

See also
 Next Generation Air Dominance (Air Force)
 Mikoyan PAK DP
 Global Combat Air Programme
 Future Combat Air System

References 

Military aircraft procurement programs of the United States
Proposed military aircraft of the United States
Carrier-based aircraft
Stealth aircraft
Delta-wing aircraft
Twinjets